Maciej Kranz (born 22 November 1964; Warsaw, Poland) is a Polish-American executive, New York Times bestselling author, angel investor, faculty member of Singularity University, and an expert in Internet of Things (IoT) technologies such as Artificial Intelligence, blockchain, and edge computing. He currently serves as Chief Technology Officer at KONE and is a frequent speaker in the fields of IoT and business practices in the tech sector.

Early life 
Maciej Kranz was born on 22 November 1964 in Warsaw, Poland to Jan  and Malgorzata Kranz. He studied at the SGH Warsaw School of Economics, during which he served as National Committee Exchange Controller for AIESEC in Poland.  Kranz later obtained his MBA at Texas Christian University.

Career 

Prior to joining KONE, Kranz served as Vice President and General Manager in the Corporate Strategic Innovation Group at Cisco Systems. During his 20 years in Cisco Systems, he has held several leadership roles in the fields of enterprise networking and the Internet of Things.

Kranz joined Cisco in 1999, where he led marketing for Cisco's stackable ethernet switching business unit. He became Vice President of Marketing for the Wireless Networking Business Unit in 2006, during which time he drove the development of Cisco Motion, a mobility vision architecture.

Kranz led the Borderless Networks effort in 2009 and in 2012 became a General Manager of the Connected Industries Group where he drove Cisco's IoT internet of things (IoT) efforts.

Before his stint at Cisco Systems, Kranz served as the Vice President of Marketing for IP Highway, Inc. and worked in product management at both 3Com, where he led the expansion and development of its ethernet network interface cards into a $1 billion product line, and IBM.

Kranz serves as a member of the board of directors for IoTecha Corp and FINABRO and is on the faculty of Singularity University.

Books 
Kranz's book, Building the Internet of Things is on the New York Times'  and USA Today's bestseller lists and was listed as one of the 10 business books every entrepreneur should read in 2017 by Fortune Magazine. The book was also selected as one of the 10 books for innovators and entrepreneurs to read by Economía y Negocios. It has been translated into 10 languages. In 2018, Kranz published  Building the Internet of Things - a Project Workbook, a companion to his first book providing interactive steps in planning, implementing, and evaluating IoT projects.

Public Platforms 
In addition to keynoting at industry conferences, Kranz frequently conducts media interviews worldwide, and regularly writes commentary as member of the Forbes Technology Council and the IDG Contributor Network, as well as for many other publications.

References

External links 
Profile at Cisco Blogs
Profile at Twitter
Profile at Bloomberg
Profile at Forbes
Profile at Network World
Profile at World Economic Forum
Profile at Entrepreneur
Profile at Harvard Business Review

1964 births
Living people
21st-century American writers
Cisco people
SGH Warsaw School of Economics alumni
Texas Christian University alumni
Scientists from Warsaw
Businesspeople from the San Francisco Bay Area
Polish emigrants to the United States